Sir William Fairbairn, 1st Baronet of Ardwick  (19 February 1789 – 18 August 1874) was a Scottish civil engineer, structural engineer and shipbuilder. In 1854 he succeeded George Stephenson and Robert Stephenson to become the third president of the Institution of Mechanical Engineers.

Early career
Born in Kelso to a local farmer, Fairbairn showed an early mechanical aptitude and served as an apprentice millwright in Newcastle upon Tyne where he befriended the young George Stephenson. He moved to Manchester in 1813 to work for Adam Parkinson and Thomas Hewes. In 1817, he launched his mill-machinery business with James Lillie as Fairbairn and Lillie Engine Makers.

Structural studies

Fairbairn was a lifelong learner and joined the Institution of Civil Engineers in 1830. In the  1820s and 30s, he and Eaton Hodgkinson conducted a search for an optimal cross section for iron beams. They designed, for example, the bridge over Water Street for the Liverpool and Manchester Railway, which opened in 1830.  In the 1840s, when Robert Stephenson, the son of his youthful friend George, was trying to  develop a way of crossing the Menai Strait, he retained both Fairbairn and Hodgkinson as consultants. It was Fairbairn who conceived the idea of a rectangular tube or box girder to bridge the large gap between Anglesey and North Wales. He conducted many tests on prototypes in his Millwall shipyard and at the site of the bridge, showing how such a tube should be constructed.  The design was first used in a shorter span at Conway, and followed by the much larger Britannia Bridge. The tube bridge ultimately proved far too costly a concept for widespread use owing to the sheer mass and cost of wrought iron needed. Fairbairn himself developed wrought iron trough bridges which used some of the ideas he had developed in the tubular bridge.

Shipbuilding
When the cotton industry fell into recession, Fairbairn diversified into the manufacture of boilers for locomotives and into shipbuilding.  Perceiving a ship as a floating tubular beam, he criticised existing design standards dictated by Lloyd's of London.

Fairbairn and Lillie built the iron paddle-steamer  at Manchester in 1830. The difficulties which were encountered in the construction of iron ships in an inland town like Manchester led to the removal of this branch of the business to Millwall, London in 1834–35. Here Fairbairn constructed over eighty vessels, including Pottinger of 1,250 tons, for the Peninsular and Oriental Company;  and other vessels for the British Government, and many others, introducing iron shipbuilding on the River Thames. In 1848 he retired from this branch of his business.

Fairbairn drew on his experience with the construction of iron-hulled ships when designing the Britannia Bridge and Conwy Railway Bridges.

Railway locomotives

Fairbairn began building railway locomotives in 1839 with an 0-4-0 design for the Manchester and Bolton Railway. By 1862 the company had constructed more than 400 at Millwall for companies such as the Great Western Railway and the London and North Western Railway. However, as the works had no rail access, any locomotives had to be shipped by road.

Boilers
Fairbairn developed the Lancashire boiler in 1844. In 1861, at the request of the UK Parliament, he conducted early research into metal fatigue, raising and lowering a 3 tonne mass onto a wrought iron cylinder 3,000,000 times before it fractured and showing that a static load of 12 tonne was needed for such an effect.

He experimented with glass cylinders and was able to show that the hoop stress in the wall was twice the longitudinal stress. When a cylindrical boiler failed, it usually fractured along its length owing to the high hoop stress in the wall.

This knowledge of how hoop stress increased with diameter, and how stresses were independent of drum length led to his invention of the Fairbairn-Beeley and his five-tube boilers, where a single large diameter shell was replaced by multiple smaller, and less stressed, shells. Eventually this would lead to the near-universal adoption of water-tube boilers with small tubes for high pressures, replacing the older fire-tube designs.

Investigations

Fairbairn was one of the first engineers to conduct systematic investigations of failures of structures, including the collapse of textile mills and boiler explosions. His report on the collapse of a mill at Oldham showed the poor design methods used by architects when specifying cast iron girders for supporting heavily loaded floors, for example. In another report, he condemned the use of trussed cast iron girders, and advised Robert Stephenson not to use the concept in a bridge then being built over the river Dee at Chester in 1846. The bridge collapsed in May 1847, killing 5 people who were passengers on the local train passing over the structure at the time. The Dee Bridge disaster raised concerns about the integrity of many other railway bridges already built or about to be built on the rail network.

Fairbairn conducted some of the first serious studies of the effects of repeated loading of wrought and cast iron girders, showing that fracture could occur by crack growth from incipient defects, a problem now known as fatigue. He built large-scale testing apparatus for the studies, and was partly funded by the Board of Trade.

He also conducted experiments on pressurized cylinders of glass and was able to show that the highest stress in the wall occurs around the diameter. It is known as the hoop stress and is twice the value of the longitudinal stress which occurs along the length of the cylinder. The precise value depends only on the wall thickness and the internal pressure. His work was published in the Proceedings of the Royal Society and was of great help in analysing failures in steam boilers and pipes. In 1854 he founded the Manchester Steam Users' Association, which quickly became recognised as setting national standards for high-pressure steam boilers. As the "Associated Offices Technical Committee" of British insurers the MSUA remains a national certification authority.

Honours
Fellow of the Royal Society elected 1850 (Gold Medal 1860)
President of the Institution of Mechanical Engineers 1854–1855.
President of the Manchester Literary and Philosophical Society (1855–1859)
Elected in February 1860 to the Smeatonian Society of Civil Engineers
Appointed Baronet, (of Ardwick), 2 November 1869; he had declined a knighthood in 1861
A statue stands in Manchester Town Hall
Conferred with Honorary Membership of the Institution of Engineers and Shipbuilders in Scotland in 1859.
President of the British Association 1861
Foreign Honorary Member of the American Academy of Arts and Sciences 1862
Inducted into the Scottish Engineering Hall of Fame in 2017.

Fairbairn is one of several notable engineers to be buried in the churchyard of St Mary's Church, Prestwich. The number of people present at his funeral was estimated at from 50,000 to 70,000.

Works

 
 

 
 

 Experiments to determine the effect of impact, vibratory action, and long continued changes of load on wrought iron girders, (1864) Philosophical Transactions of the Royal Society of London vol. 154, p311

Further reading
 The Life of Sir William Fairbairn, Bart., (ed. W. Pole, 1877)

See also
Bombay Spinning and Weaving Company
McConnel & Kennedy Mills

References

External links

1789 births
1874 deaths
Fairbairn, William, 1st Baronet
British naval architects
British structural engineers
Scottish civil engineers
Engineers from Manchester
Shipbuilding in London
People from Kelso, Scottish Borders
Royal Medal winners
Millwrights
Ships built in Millwall
Fellows of the American Academy of Arts and Sciences
Fellows of the Royal Society
19th-century British engineers
People educated at Kelso High School, Scotland
Scottish Engineering Hall of Fame inductees
Manchester Literary and Philosophical Society
19th-century British businesspeople